The Winnipeg Labour Council is a labour council based in Winnipeg, Manitoba, Canada. Affiliated to the Canadian Labour Congress, it represents 50,000+ workers in Winnipeg through 27 affiliated labour unions.

List of affiliated unions 
 ACTE, Local 1725
 ACTRA
 Amalgamated Transit Union, Local  1505
 Bakery Confectionery & Tobacco Workers International Union Local 389
 UNIFOR, Locals 144, 100-550, 101-6, 101-35, 468, 561,  2169, 2002, 3003, 3005, Locals 7,  341, 681, 816, 821, 830
 Canadian Office & Professional Employees Union, Locals  225 & 342
 Canadian Union of Public Employees, Locals 110, 500, 1475, 1543, 1973, 2343, 2348, 2509, 2836, 3242, 4635
 Canadian Union of Postal Workers, Winnipeg and Red River Locals
 Construction and Specialized Workers Union Local 1258
 International Association of Theatrical & Stage Employees, Locals 63 & 856
 International Association of Machinists & Aerospace Workers, Locals 741, 1953, 2603
 International Union of Operating Engineers, Local 987
 International Brotherhood of Electrical Workers, Local 2034 & 2085
 Manitoba Federation of Union Retirees
 Manitoba Government and General Employees' Union
 Telecommunications Employees Association of Manitoba
 United Steelworkers of America, Locals 3239 & 1-830
 United Steelworkers of America Affiliate Locals (Winnipeg Labour Council), Locals 4297, 7292, 7386,  7826, 7975, 8283, 9355
 United Food & Commercial Workers Local 832
 United Firefighters of Winnipeg, Local 867
 University of Winnipeg Faculty Association
 University of Manitoba Faculty Association
List accurate as of February 2014

See also

References

External links
 Winnipeg Labour Council web site.

Trade unions in Manitoba
Trades councils